Linden is an unincorporated community in Manitoba, Canada, within the Rural Municipality of Taché.

Notable residents 

Pat Falloon, professional hockey player

References 

Unincorporated communities in Manitoba